Pascal Martinot-Lagarde (born 22 September 1991) is a French athlete who specialises in the sprint hurdles.

Born to a French father and a mother from the Ivory Coast, he has written his name in his country's record books.

He is a three-time medalist in the 60 metres hurdles at the IAAF World Indoor Championships and also won the bronze medal in the 110 metres at the 2014 European Championships and the gold medal at the 2018 European Championships in the same event. He also won the bronze medal at the 2019 World Championships

He set his personal best of 12.95 seconds in July 2014 in Monaco. His brother Thomas, also a promising hurdler, similarly achieved a personal best at the same meeting.

International competitions

Personal best

References

External links

1991 births
Living people
Sportspeople from Saint-Maur-des-Fossés
French male hurdlers
French sportspeople of Ivorian descent
Olympic male hurdlers
Olympic athletes of France
Athletes (track and field) at the 2016 Summer Olympics
World Athletics Championships athletes for France
World Athletics Championships medalists
European Athletics Championships winners
Diamond League winners
Athletes (track and field) at the 2020 Summer Olympics
World Athletics Indoor Championships medalists
20th-century French people
21st-century French people